The Social Movement Tricolour Flame (MSFT), commonly known as Tricolour Flame (Fiamma Tricolore), is a neo-fascist political party in Italy.

History
The party was started by the more radical members of the Fascist Italian Social Movement, led by Pino Rauti, who refused to join the mainstream conservative party National Alliance. Rauti was later ousted by Luca Romagnoli, who took over leadership.

In the 2004 European Parliamentary Election the party gained enough votes in the Southern constituency to elect Luca Romagnoli to the European Parliament.  The party was then a member of the House of Freedoms coalition for the 2006 general election.

In the coming of the 2008 general election, Tricolour Flame formed a joint list called The Right–Tricolour Flame with The Right of Francesco Storace, a splinter group of National Alliance, in support of the candidacy of Daniela Santanchè for Prime Minister.

On 8 November 2013, Luca Romagnoli, secretary of Tricolour Flame, together with the secretary of The Right Francesco Storace, the regent of Future and Freedom Roberto Menia, the leader of I the South Adriana Poli Bortone, Domenico Nania of the association New Alliance, Oreste Tofani of the association Nazione Sovrana, Antonio Buonfiglio of the association Il Popolo della Vita and Roberto Buonasorte, editor of the online newspaper Il Giornale d'Italia, founded the Movement for National Alliance, a federation of right movements inspired to National Alliance.
On 9 December 2013 the Central Committee of Tricolour Flame distrusted Luca Romagnoli, because he joined this initiative without having preventively sought the opinion of the same Committee, and  Attilio Carelli became regent Secretary of the party. After the expulsion Romagnoli founded instead his new political movement, Social Right.

On 13 and 14 December 2014, the VII National Congress officially appointed Carelli as Secretary of the party.

For the 2018 general election, it formed the Italy for the Italians coalition along with the New Force party. At 2019 European Parliamentary Election the party decides not to participate.

On 12 September 2021 the Central Committee of the party declared the Secretary Carelli officially lapsed due to the failure to present the budget for the year 2020. The same Central Committee, on 6 October 2021 conferred the mandate of Regent Secretary to Giuseppe Manoli.

On 15 and 16 January 2022 the IX National Congress took place entirely on the Zoom platform, on this occasion Daniele Cerbella was be elected as National Secretary.

Ideology

Tricolour Flame is the party of the Italian far-right most closely tied to the legacy of Italian Social Republic (RSI). The RSI is usually seen by the party as the example of what Fascism should have been, in particular as an example of true welfare state. As a sign of this legacy, the party, for example, guarantees free membership for ex-RSI military. A press release from the Rome section of the party states:

Tricolour Flame maintains a fairly strong anti-capitalist stance, and it can be thought to be the Italian party closest to third positionist ideology along with the New Force and CasaPound parties.

Recently Tricolour Flame has been peculiar, among Italian neo-fascist organizations, in actively trying to attract the young masses and renewing its political practices and communication techniques in a more modern, innovative fashion. Political manifests often tend towards attractive, modern graphics and clear-cut, even humorous slogans. Tricolour Flame is also very close to youth far-right organizations and initiatives, of which the most relevant is CasaPound, a social centre in Rome.

The party is against the regionalism promoted by the Northern League for an independent "Padania", instead favoring a united Italy.

Membership
Among the more controversial members of Tricolur Flame are Pietro Puschiavo and Maurizio Boccacci. In 1985 Puschiavo was a founding member of the Veneto Skinheads Front, a far-right skinhead group based in Veneto and connected to Blood and Honour. Boccacci is the former leader of the Western Political Movement, a far-right skinhead organization based in Rome.

Election results

Leadership
Secretary: Pino Rauti (1995–2002), Luca Romagnoli (2002–2013), Attilio Carelli (2013–2021), Giuseppe Manoli (2021–present)
President: Romolo Sabatini (1995–2000), Stelvio Dal Piaz (2000–2002), Pino Rauti (2002–2004), Rocco Tauro (2004–2013), Attilio Carelli (2013–2014), Francesco Condorelli Caff (2014–present)
Honorary President: Manlio Sargenti (1995–2001), Alessandro Bordoni (2013–2018), Carlo Morganti (2018–present)

See also
New Force

References

External links
Official website
Footage of a Tricolur Flame rally in Rome

1995 establishments in Italy
Political parties established in 1995
Neo-fascist organisations in Italy
Euronat members
Third Position
Right-wing populism in Italy
Eurosceptic parties in Italy
Nationalist parties in Italy
Far-right parties in Europe